Ibbs is a surname. Notable people with the surname include:

Robert Leigh Ibbs, co-founder of Ibbs and Tillett
Robin Ibbs (1926–2014), British businessman, government advisor, and Royal Navy officer

See also
Gibbs (surname)